Shakirovka (Şakir) is a rural locality (a village) and the administrative center of Krasnokurtovsky Selsoviet, Arkhangelsky District, Bashkortostan, Russia. The population was 126 as of 2010. There are 3  streets.

Geography 
Shakirovka is located 28 km north of Arkhangelskoye (the district's administrative centre) by road. Sagitovo is the nearest rural locality.

References 

Rural localities in Arkhangelsky District